CJXK-FM is a Canadian radio station, broadcasting at 95.3 FM in Cold Lake, Alberta owned by Stingray Group. The station broadcasts a classic hits format branded as Boom 95.3.

The station originally began broadcasting on December 1, 1979 on the frequency 1340 kHz, until it received approval by the CRTC in 2003 to move to the FM dial, which officially happened on September 3, 2004. At the same time as the move to FM, the station flipped to classic rock as 95.3 K-Rock.

On July 7, 2017, CJXK changed its format to classic hits as Boom 95.3.

References

External links
 Boom 95.3
 
 

JXK
JXK
JXK
Radio stations established in 1979
1979 establishments in Alberta